Besseggen or Besseggi is a mountain ridge in Vågå Municipality in Innlandet county, Norway. The mountain ridge is surrounded by several other notable mountains including Veslfjellet to the east and Besshø to the northwest. The ridge runs between the lakes Gjende and Bessvatnet.

The walk over Besseggen is one of the most popular mountain hikes in Norway. About 30,000 people walk this trip each year. The route over Besseggen starts at Gjendesheim, up to the trails highest point, Veslfjellet (at ), down Besseggen, further over the relatively flat area Bandet (at the foot of Besshø), and ends at Memurubu, where one may take the regularly scheduled ferry route back to Gjendesheim.  Many choose to do the hike in the other direction by starting at Memurubu after first taking the ferry there from Gjendesheim. The trip is estimated to take about 5–7 hours to walk without rest stops.

From Besseggen there is a great view over the lakes Gjende and Bessvatnet. One of the unique aspects of the view is that Gjende lies almost  lower than Bessvatnet, and while Bessvatnet has a blue color typical of other lakes, Gjende has a distinct green color.  The green color is the result from glacier runoff containing clay (rock flour).  Looking down towards Memurubu one can see the nearby river Muru coloring the water with a light colored runoff.

Impact of tourism
The large number of hikers has led to serious erosion on the trails leading to Besseggen, both from Gjendesheim and Memurubu. In 2005 the Norwegian government authorized spending of  towards the restoration of the trails. The project involves placing stone plates on the trail to limit additional damage and prevent further erosion. The stone plates were flown in by helicopter from Vågå since mass harvesting of stone from Jotunheimen is illegal. The technique used to pave the trail is modeled on the methods developed for the Snowdonia National Park in Wales.

Media gallery

Competitions
In 1961, 1962, and 1963 a race across Besseggen called «Besseggløpet» was held during the summer. The race was organized by Norges Orienteringsforbund in cooperation with Den Norske Turistforening. The record time from 1963 is held by Reidar Andreassen who was almost four and a half minutes ahead of the next finisher.  The record time of 1 hour 16 minutes and 48 seconds still holds today. The women's record, set in 1963, is held by Valborg Østberg from Gjøvik with a time of 1 hour 39 minutes and 47 seconds. She was a 32 year old housewife and mother of two kids and the Dagbladet newspaper said that she "ran like a goat over Besseggen".

In literature
Besseggen is known from act 1, scene 1 of Henrik Ibsens play Peer Gynt. Peer tries to convince his mother, Åse, that he has ridden over Gjendineggen, now known as Besseggen, on a reindeer bull.

Besseggen is also described in the poem «Besseggen» by Ragnvald Skrede.

Name
The mountain ridge is named after Bessvatnet, the last element is the finite form off egg which means 'edge'. In the local dialect, the form is Besseggje. The Bokmål written form of the name is Besseggen and the Nynorsk written form is Besseggi.

See also
List of mountains of Norway by height

References

Further reading

External links 

 Infopage Jotunheimen / Besseggen
 Memurubu cabin
 Gjendesheim cabin
 Infopage Besseggen
 Ferry on Gjende (Gjendebåtene)
 Article on Besseggløpet 
 UT.no about hiking on Besseggen 
 https://www.ncbar.org/news/norwegian-hiking-adventure-tests-members-mettle/

Jotunheimen
Vågå
Mountains of Innlandet
Landforms of Innlandet
Ridges of Europe